Brănești may refer to several places:

 Brănești, Dâmbovița, a commune in Dâmbovița County, Romania
 Brănești, Gorj, a commune in Gorj County, Romania
 Brănești, Ilfov, a commune in Ilfov County, Romania
 Brănești, a village in Vlădești, Galați, Romania
 Brănești, a district in Făget town, Timiș County, Romania
 Brănești, Orhei, a village in Ivancea commune, Orhei raion, Moldova

See also 
 Bran (disambiguation)
 Braniște (disambiguation)
 Braniștea (disambiguation)
 Brăneasa River